Taipei People is a collection of 14 short stories written by Pai Hsien-yung in the 1960s, published in 1971.  The length and art of each story is different, but all these short stories are about people who came from Mainland China to Taiwan in the 1950s, and about their life in Taipei.  Some of the stories were also published in Wandering in the Garden, Waking from a Dream (1968).

Context 
"Taipei People" is the iconic literary work reflecting the experience of people from Mainland China ("mainlanders", waishengren) who fled to Taiwan following the War of Resistance against Japan and the Chinese Civil War and founding of the People's Republic of China in 1949.

Structure and Format 
The format and topic of this book is often compared to James Joyce's "Dubliners". Both of the books are short story series, and they are all about people in a certain city. Also, another book of Pai Hsien-yung called "New Yorkers" are similar to the two books.

Themes 
Although these people are called "Taipei People", in their minds they are always reminiscing the scintillating old times in Mainland China, therefore most of them don't really belong to Taipei mentally. Their loss and their sense of insecurity is what this book is depicting.

Motifs 
The stories are interwoven with a large number of motifs that are very suggestive of the place, the time, and the people. Some of them include dance halls, teahouses, taxi dancer, and (sexual) patronage; mahjong; the Kuomintang military, especially the officer corps; China's diverse regions; fashion, especially the chipao (qipao); traditional Chinese interior furnishings; Buddhism; Peking opera; separation; and many others.

Related works 
The collection has been translated into English and other languages.  The stories have been also reworked to dramas in Hong Kong and Taiwan, and a movie in Taiwan.

Short stories synopses 
"Taipei People" consists of fourteen stories:

 The Eternal Snow Beauty (永遠的尹雪豔)
 A Touch of Green (一把青)
 New Year's Eve (歲除)
 The Last Night of Taipan Chin (金大班的最後一夜)
 A Sea of Blood-red Azaleas (那片血一般紅的杜鵑花)
 Ode to Bygone Days (思舊賦)
 The Dirge of Liang Fu (梁父吟)
 Love's Lone Flower (孤戀花)
 Glory's by Blossom Bridge (花橋榮記)
 Autumn Reveries (秋思)
 A Sky Full of Bright, Twinkling Stars (滿天裏亮晶晶的星星)
 Wandering in the Garden, Waking from a Dream (遊園驚夢)
 Winter Night (冬夜)
 State Funeral (國葬)

Brief synopses are provided below. (Based on the English translation by the author and Patia Yasin, published as "Wandering in the Garden, Waking from a Dream.")

The Eternal Snow Beauty (永遠的尹雪豔)

The aging "Snow Beauty" (Yin Hsueh-yen) looks back on her days as the belle of Shanghai's Paramount ballroom; she is still the center of attention at upscale mahjong soirees she arranges at her Taipei home.

A Touch of Green (一把青)

In an extended tale, the (female) narrator observes how an innocent middle school bride (Verdancy Chu) transcends the death of her air force pilot husband during the war years to attain some degree of stability in the post-war Taiwan environment.

The story touches on the KMT-related New Life Movement as an element of continuity in the social life of mainland loyalists in the pre- and post-war eras.

New Year's Eve (歲除)
A visit by a former commanding officer (Brother Lai) for some New Year's Eve dining and drinking provides a contrast between the heroic tales of past military exploits and the limitations of his current situation.

An important "character" in the story is the fiery Kaoliang wine, famous in Taiwan for its power.

The Last Night of Taipan Chin (金大班的最後一夜)
"Taipan Chin" is actually a woman who commands a taxi dancer group. In the story, she reflects on her choices, especially the insurmountable contradictions between wealth/security vs. love vs. freedom.

A Sea of Blood-red Azaleas (那片血一般紅的杜鵑花)
A servant, Wang Hsiung, epitomizes the torment of exile.  The story is pervaded with "fish out of water" symbolism.

The story leans heavily on the use of the azalea as a symbol of homesickness and exile in Chinese culture.

Ode to Bygone Days (思舊賦)
Two old servants meet and talk about all the changes around them, especially those occurring in the rich family they have served.  The story views decay as seen from beneath.

The story falls in a genre that explores the equivalence of the "mansion" and the "family," and the interweaving threads in their parallel growth and decline, in (modern) Chinese literature. See, for instance, Ba Jin's Family and the classic of late imperial Chinese literature, Dream of the Red Chamber.

The Dirge of Liang Fu (梁父吟)
On the occasion of the funeral of a general, one of his cohorts recounts past exploits.  The story conveys the utter resolution of substantial elements of the elite mainlander class to "recover the Mainland," even as age and distance render their desires impossible.

The story includes a recounting of events connected to the Wuchang Uprising, the first event in the 1911 Revolution that gave birth to the Republic of China.

"The Dirge of Liang Fu" refers to specific compositions in classic Chinese literature, and suggests the way in which exile and return have been the subject of Chinese poets such as Tu Fu.

Love's Lone Flower (孤戀花)
"Peach Blossom" is the protégé and companion of the female protagonist; both are club escorts. Peach Blossom becomes falls into a deadly and insanity-creating spiral with a thug, Yama.

The context of the story is yet another variant of the Chinese "pleasure quarters," the winehouse.

Glory's by Blossom Bridge (花橋榮記)
"Glory's" is a restaurant, and the noodles it serves could stand as a tenuous link between distant Kweilin—the site of its predecessor—and Taiwan.

All of the stories in the collection make use of allusions to particular regions in mainland China; this story's allusion to Kweilin is special, since that is the author's home province, Kweilin (Guilin).  Through references to food, landscape, and the unique Kweilin opera, he suggests the particular poignancy of exile from that place.

Autumn Reveries (秋思)
Autumn means "aging," and this jewel of a story focuses on the power and fragility of beauty.

The story alludes to the use of the chrysanthemum as a symbol of the transience of life—its brilliant, brief flowering followed by excruciating decline—in Chinese (and Japanese) culture.

A Sky Full of Bright, Twinkling Stars (滿天裏亮晶晶的星星)
Capturing a "beat" sensibility that finds extended development in much Taiwan literature, this story about (gay) street characters who frequent Taipei's New Park—The Guru, Ah Hsiung the Primitive, Dark-and-Handsome, Little Jade—concludes with a potent symbol of how very different people (and peoples) are thrown into each other's arms.

This story alludes to the bright effluorescence of the Shanghai film industry in the '20s and '30s.

Wandering in the Garden, Waking from a Dream (遊園驚夢)
The collection's eponymous story is a tour-de-force of Chinese cultural allusion, as it contrasts the pre-Taiwan condition of a group of Kun Opera singers (Fragrant Cassia, Heavenly Pepper, Red Red Rose) with their current position as wives (or ex-wives or widows) of prominent society figures (Madan Ch'ien . . . Madam Tou . . . Madam Jen . . . . ).

The story interweaves abundant allusion to a specific variety of Chinese opera called Kunqu in general, including its many roles and unique sounds, together with a specific episode from the opera The Peony Pavilion ("Wandering in the Garden, Waking from a Dream").  Moreover, these are interwoven with allusions to the dashing and machismo of the Kuomintang officer corps and a whole host of allusions to the sensuous pleasures of elite Chinese societies - the shimmer of silk cheongsam, the smell of high quality rosewood Chinese furniture, the taste of dishes from Chinese cuisine specially selected for the event.

Kunqu is itself native to the area near Nanjing and Suzhou in China, in other words, it refers to the seat of Kuomintang government and support prior to exile in Taiwan. The story alludes to specific dishes of the Huaiyang cuisine, another reminder of the Nanjing area.

Winter Night (冬夜)
In a richly ironic tale, two professors talk about their careers, and the contrast between their glorious and idealistic student days—particularly their role in the student demonstrations that ushered in the May Fourth Movement—and the feelings of failure, hypocrisy, and desertion that they currently battle.

State Funeral (國葬)
This story takes a none-too-subtle parting shot at the Mainlander ethos.  At a state funeral for an important general such as his father, the general's old aide is bewildered to confront the old and feeble men who once constituted China's "Steel Army" and "Iron Forces." The only connection to the old Mainland idea seems to be the long line of black limousines, "like a serpent," in the funeral procession.

This story, written about 7 years before the death of Chiang Kai-shek seems to foretell the inevitable consequences of the natural death of the KMT's military leaders.

References 
 Taipei People, written by Pai Hsien-yung, translated into English by Pai Hsien-yung and Yeh Pei-Shia, edited by George Kao. .
 Wandering in the Garden, Waking from a Dream: Tales of Taipei Characters, written by Pai Hsien-yung, translated into English by Pai Hsien-yung and Patia Yasin, edited by George Kao. .

Collections
 Taipei People (bilingual edition). Tr. by the author and Patia Yasin, Edited by George Kao. HK: The Chinese University Press, 1999.

Individual stories
 "The Eternal Yin Hsueh-yen." Tr. Katherine Carlitz and Anthony C. Yu. Renditions, 5 (1975): 89-97. (See "The Eternal Snow Beauty" above.)
 "Jung's by the Blossom Bridge." Tr. Chu Limin. In Chi Pang-yuan, et al., eds., An Anthology of Contemporary Chinese Literature. Taipei: National Institute for Compilation and Translation, 1975, 2: 279-94. (See "Glory's by Blossom Bridge" above.)
 "Miss Chin's Farewell Night." Tr. Stephen Cheng. Stone Lion Review 2 (1978). (See "The Last Night of Taipan Ch'in" above.)
 "New Year's Eve." TR. Diana Grant. Renditions 5 (1975): 98-117. (See "New Year's Eve" above.)
 "State Funeral." Trs. Bai Xianyong and Patia Yasin. In Pang-yuan Chi and David Der-wei Wang, eds., The Last of the Whampoa Breed: Stories of the Chinese Diaspora.New York: Columbia University Press, 2003. (See "State Funeral" above.)
 "Winter Nights." Trs. John Kwan-Terry and Stephen Lacey. In Joseph S.M. Lau, ed., Chinese Stories From Taiwan: 1960-1970. NY: Columbia UP, 1976, 337-54. Also trans. as "One Winter Evening." Tr. Chu Limin. In Chi Pang-yuan, et al., eds., An Anthology of Contemporary Chinese Literature. Taipei: National Institute for Compilation and Translation, 1975, II, 261-78. (See "Winter Night" above.)

Notes

1971 short story collections
1971 in Taiwan
Taiwanese short story collections
Culture in Taipei